Paramus Reformed Church Historic District is a historic district bounded by Franklin Turnpike, Route 17, Saddle River, south side of Valleau Cemetery, and E Glen Avenue in Ridgewood, Bergen County, New Jersey, United States.

The congregation was established in 1725 by Dutch settlers. The stone church was built in 1800, replacing an earlier building from 1735 and using the bricks of the old church. The district was added to the National Register of Historic Places on February 25, 1975. The church also has a small gated cemetery with graves of Dutch ancestors and a path that leads to a nearby residential street.

The church was used as a hospital, barrack and prison in the Revolutionary War. The church is currently still in use. 

On November 16th and December 26th, 2014, Joseph Galli of Somerville allegedly used a high powered AR-15 rifle to shoot inside the church. This led to the breaking of a stained glass window dating back to 1875. Him and Alexander Norell were charged with more than $2,000 in property damage and indicted for gun charges with an assault rifle.

See also 
 National Register of Historic Places listings in Bergen County, New Jersey
 Revolutionary War

References

Presbyterian churches in New Jersey
Churches on the National Register of Historic Places in New Jersey
Historic districts on the National Register of Historic Places in New Jersey
Churches completed in 1800
Churches in Bergen County, New Jersey
Geography of Bergen County, New Jersey
National Register of Historic Places in Bergen County, New Jersey
Ridgewood, New Jersey
New Jersey Register of Historic Places
18th-century churches in the United States
1725 establishments in New Jersey